Bondeson Glacier is a glacier about  long, flowing north along the east side of Benson Ridge into the lower portion of Robb Glacier. It was mapped by the United States Geological Survey from tellurometer surveys (1961–62) and from Navy air photos (1960), and named by the Advisory Committee on Antarctic Names for W. Bondeson, Master of the USNS Private John R. Towle during U.S. Navy Operation Deepfreeze 1964 and 1965.

References 

Glaciers of Shackleton Coast